The Allentown 2019 special mayoral election was held on May 19, 2019 following the resignation of Democratic mayor Ed Pawlowski. Incumbent interim Democratic mayor Ray O'Connell would defeat Republican challenger Timothy Ramos.

Background

During the 2017 Allentown mayoral election, three term mayor Ed Pawlowski was indited by the Federal Bureau of Investigation and faced 54 charges including multiple counts of conspiracy, bribery, attempted extortion, false statements to federal officials, mail fraud, and wire fraud with some charges dating as far back as 2012. He refused to step down as mayor, or stop campaigning for his fourth term as mayor. He would go on to narrowly win the election 39.37% to his Republican challenger's 36.74% with write in votes for city councilmen Ray O'Connell numbering at about 18%. Pawlowski would be found guilty on 47 charges shortly after the election on March 1, 2018, and be forced to resign as mayor on March 9, 2018, and was sentenced to 20 years in federal prison. With the office of mayor now being vacant a special election would have to held in order to fill it. Councilmen Ray O'Connell was appointed interim mayor by the city council until the election.

Campaign

There was only one primary, the Democratic primary as Republican Tim Ramos was running unopposed. There where four democratic candidates. the first being the incumbent interim mayor Ray O'Connell, who, during his brief time in office, had already become unpopular due to a 27% tax hike and $10 million loan to cover the city budget. Cheryl Johnson-Watts, a Financial adviser and Allentown School Board director was the primary critic to O’Connell's economic plan of increasing taxes and taking out loans to plug the budget. Patrick Palmer, an insurance representative and political outsider, based his campaign on ensuring that low and medium density housing would be set aside during rezoning ordinance. Lastly, Michael Daniels, a former Constable who had not been licensed since 2017, ran as an anti-establishment candidate calling for an increased police presence in the city. Incumbent O'Connell successfully defeated the three challengers with 53% of the vote and advanced to the general election where he defeated Republican challenger Ramos 66.73% to 32.99%.

Results

See also
 2019 United States elections
 List of mayors of Allentown, Pennsylvania

References

Allentown
 2019
Allentown